|- style="vertical-align: top;"
| Distance 
| 160,000 ly 

PSR J0523−7125 is a pulsar that, due to its size and brightness, was initially believed to be a distant galaxy. Investigation via the Australian Square Kilometre Array Pathfinder showed the pulsar to have a high circular polarization with a steep spectrum. Its rotation measure is twice as large as any other pulsar found in the Large Magellanic Cloud, which also makes it one of the most luminous pulsars ever found.

References

Stars in the Large Magellanic Cloud
Dorado (constellation)
Pulsars